Gajendra Narayan Singh may refer to:
Gajendra Narayan Singh (politician)
Gajendra Narayan Singh (musicologist)
Gajendra Narayan Singh Sagarmatha Zonal Hospital